The New Synagogue in Nyíregyháza is a large Jewish religious building located in the Great Hungarian Plains region of Hungary. It was opened for public access in 1932.

History 
The synagogue was built between 1924 and 1932. The architecture was planned by the famous Hungarian Synagogue Architect Lipót Baumhorn. Its external dimensions are 21.14 × 31.22 meters, while the Synagogue Square is 22.0 × 19.35 meters. It has seating capacity for  410 males and 286 females. For women's seating, a gallery was built around the three sides of the interior. In the middle of the interior is the Bema. The main architectural motif of the interior is the so-called eastern wall (Mizrah) and the cupboard. The latter is a party-building with double Corinthian columns. The semicircular cab has the following inscription: "Father, King, open the gates of heaven to our prayers." (Psalm 113: 3). The lake is surrounded by a large arcade with lined ornamentation, which integrates the lake cabin with the ornate circular window, bridging the columns in a semicircle. The wall's curve has a lion detailing with text reading: "Praise the Eternal Name from Sunrise to Sunset." (Psalm 113: 3).

The synagogue, together with other religious buildings in its vicinity, is still used by the local Jewish community.

References

Sources 
 (szerk.) Gerő László: Magyarországi zsinagógák, Műszaki Könyvkiadó, Budapest, 1989, 177. o.

Synagogues in Hungary
Synagogues completed in 1932
Nyíregyháza
Great Hungarian Plain